Leonardo Julio Farkas Klein (born March 20, 1967) is a Chilean businessman.

Early years 
Farkas's parents were Jews of Hungarian descent who emigrated from Transylvania to South America in 1939.

Farkas studied business administration at the University of Santiago, Chile. In the 1980s, he emigrated to the United States and made a living working in show business as a piano player while traveling throughout the country. He also worked in several Caribbean cruising companies until the death of his father. Farkas then returned to Chile to manage the family business. He has stakes in several industries, the mining sector being the most important.

Consideration of presidential candidacy 
In October 2008 Farkas announced that he was considering being an independent candidate for the presidential election of 2009. Initially, he declined to comment on the issue. However, on December 5, he announced he would not be running.

Philanthropy 
Farkas is widely known in Chile by his appearances in the Teletón (Chilean telethon), a fundraising campaign for handicapped children. Farkas donated hundreds of millions of pesos, and in 2008, donated 1 billion pesos (approx. US$2 million), becoming the first individual to donate such amount of money to this campaign (matched hours later by José Luis Nazar during the same event).

Farkas has been very critical of the Chilean upper class, stating that "they’re usually very stingy and elitist" and don't do enough to mitigate Chile's social problems. He has also said that if elected president "all Chileans would have their own house". This rhetoric of appealing to the masses of poor people has gained him substantial support among that social group and some harsh criticism from his business peers and local politicians, often labeling him as a "populist" in search of some spotlight.

During the rescue operation in Copiapó, Chile of the trapped miners, Farkas donated $10,000 to each of the 33 rescued men. Farkas reportedly gave checks in the miners' names to each of the families and set up a separate fund to collect donations.

On July 1, 2011, Farkas was given an award by the Viña del Mar Mayor for his contributions to the city.

On February 7, 2018, Farkas offered a reward of 10 million Chilean pesos for anyone who found Emmelyn Catalina Cañales Vidal, an 11-year-old girl who was kidnapped in Licantén, Chile.

Farkas is also known as a patron of many other charities, including the March of the Living an annual educational program which brings students from all over the world to Poland, to study the history of the Holocaust and examine the roots of prejudice, intolerance and hate.

According to a study, coordinated by Magdalena Aninat, director of the Centro de Filantropía e Inversiones Sociales (Cefis) of the Universidad Adolfo Ibáñez (UAI), which investigated the philanthropy and social investments of Chilean companies, concluded that "Farkas is an actor that it is pushing others and acting as a 'role of conscience.' It has a very interesting role to make visible a more American model of the success of the business world, where that success closes with returning the hand to society. In Chile we are not used to making donations visible, but Farkas is constantly challenging the business world to be present and that is positive," said the UAI academic.

Religion 
In 2014, with the support of Leonardo Farkas, March of the Living marked the 70th anniversary of the destruction of Hungarian Jewry at the hands of the Nazis in 1944 during World War II. On Holocaust Remembrance Day, at the close of the memorial ceremony on the actual grounds of Auschwitz-Birkenau, a number of Holocaust survivors – many whose relatives perished in the infamous death camp –  joined Leonardo Farkas in the writing of the last letters of a Torah. The Torah was donated to the March of the Living by Mr. Farkas, whose philanthropy also enabled students and survivors to take part in the March of the Living.

In 2014, Leonardo donated the seven newly written Sefer Torah sent to six different continents: Africa, Asia, Australia, Europe, North America and South America. Farkas has a great passion for dedicating "Happy Torahs", as he refers to them, which will be used in places with a great need. Over the years, he donated many Sefer Torahs to the Chabad-Lubavitch hassidic Jewish organization and other institutions around the world.

References 

1967 births
Living people
Chilean businesspeople
Chilean businesspeople in mining
Chilean engineers
Chilean Jews
Chilean musicians
Chilean pianists
Male pianists
Chilean philanthropists
University of Santiago, Chile alumni
Candidates for President of Chile
Chilean people of Hungarian-Jewish descent
21st-century pianists
Chilean male musicians
21st-century male musicians